Macronematinae is a subfamily level taxon consisting of net-spinning caddisflies whose larvae use webs to catch prey drifting in flowing waterways. It is part of the Animalia kingdom and was catalogued by Ulmer in 1905.

References

External links
 http://www.econinjas.com/life/tsn598226

Trichoptera subfamilies